Duncan J. McNabb (born August 8, 1952) is a retired United States Air Force general who last served as the ninth commander, United States Transportation Command from September 5, 2008, to October 17, 2011. He previously served as the 33rd Vice Chief of Staff of the Air Force.

After retiring from the Air Force, McNabb and William Fraser III attempted to cash in on consulting contracts with Azerbaijani cargo carrier Silk Way Airlines in 2014, with both standing to make $5,000 a day. However, their business ventures in Azerbaijan were flagged and ultimately blocked by the United States Department of Defense and State Department, considering their requests to be a threat to national security and a potential embarrassment if the information was ever made public. Documents of the dispute were eventually reported by The Washington Post in 2022.

Military career
McNabb graduated from the United States Air Force Academy in 1974. A command pilot, he has amassed more than 5,400 flying hours in transport and rotary wing aircraft. He has held command and staff positions at squadron, group, wing, major command and Department of Defense levels. During Operation Desert Shield and Operation Desert Storm, McNabb commanded the 41st Military Airlift Squadron, which earned Military Airlift Command's Airlift Squadron of the Year in 1990. He commanded the 89th Operations Group, overseeing the air transportation of the United States' leaders, including the president, vice president, secretary of state and secretary of defense. He then served as commander of the 62nd Airlift Wing. The wing's performance in 1996 earned the Riverside Trophy as the 15th Air Force's outstanding wing. He also commanded the Tanker Airlift Control Center where he planned, scheduled and directed a fleet of more than 1,400 aircraft in support of combat delivery and strategic airlift, air refueling and aeromedical operations around the world. McNabb was then commander of Air Mobility Command, where he led 134,000 total force Airmen in providing rapid global mobility, aerial refueling, special airlift and aeromedical evacuation for America's armed forces.

McNabb's staff assignments have been a variety of planning, programming and logistical duties. These include serving as the deputy chief of staff for plans and programs on the Air Staff and chairman of the Air Force Board having oversight of all Air Force programs. He also served as the director for Logistics on the Joint Staff where he was responsible for operational logistics and strategic mobility support to the Chairman of the Joint Chiefs of Staff and the Secretary of Defense. General McNabb retired from the Air Force on November 30, 2011, after over 37 years of service.

Education

Assignments

June 1974 – May 1975, student, undergraduate navigator training, Mather Air Force Base, California
August 1975 – April 1978, instructor navigator, 14th Military Airlift Squadron, Norton Air Force Base, California
April 1978 – April 1979, airlift director, 63rd Military Airlift Wing, Norton Air Force Base, California
April 1979 – April 1980, student, undergraduate pilot training, Williams Air Force Base, Arizona
August 1980 – August 1983, instructor pilot and chief pilot, 14th Military Airlift Squadron, Norton Air Force Base, California
August 1983 – July 1984, general's aide, Air Force Inspection and Safety Center, Norton Air Force Base, California
July 1984 – June 1986, Chief, Plans Integration Branch, Headquarters Military Airlift Command, Scott Air Force Base, Illinois
June 1986 – June 1988, aide to the commander, United States Transportation Command and Military Airlift Command, Scott Air Force Base, Illinois
June 1988 – November 1990, chief pilot, later, operations officer, 17th Military Airlift Squadron, Charleston Air Force Base, South Carolina
November 1990 – January 1992, commander, 41st Military Airlift Squadron, Charleston Air Force Base, South Carolina
January 1992 – August 1992, deputy group commander, 437th Operations Group, Charleston Air Force Base, South Carolina
August 1992 – June 1993, student, Industrial College of the Armed Forces, Fort Lesley J. McNair, Washington, D.C.
July 1993 – June 1995, chief, Logistics Readiness Center, the Joint Staff, Washington, D.C.
July 1995 – July 1996, commander, 89th Operations Group, Andrews Air Force Base, Maryland
July 1996 – July 1997, commander, 62d Airlift Wing, McChord Air Force Base, Washington
August 1997 – June 1999, commander, Tanker Airlift Control Center, Headquarters Air Mobility Command, Scott Air Force Base, Illinois
June 1999 – December 1999, deputy director of programs, Office of the deputy chief of staff for plans and Programs, Headquarters, United States Air Force, Washington, D.C.
December 1999 – April 2002, director of programs, Office of the deputy chief of staff for plans and Programs, Headquarters, United States Air Force, Washington, D.C.
April 2002 – July 2004, deputy chief of staff for plans and programs, Headquarters, United States Air Force, Washington, D.C.
August 2004 – October 2005, director for logistics, the Joint Staff, Washington, D.C.
October 2005 – September 2007, commander, Headquarters Air Mobility Command, Scott Air Force Base, Illinois
September 2007 – September 2008, Vice Chief of Staff, Headquarters, United States Air Force, Washington, D.C.
September 2008 – October 2011, commander, United States Transportation Command, Scott Air Force Base, Illinois

Flight information

Awards and decorations

Other achievements

Effective dates of promotion

References

United States Air Force Academy alumni
United States Air Force generals
Recipients of the Legion of Merit
Harvard Kennedy School alumni
Johns Hopkins University alumni
Living people
1952 births
Recipients of the Order of the Sword (United States)
Recipients of the Defense Superior Service Medal
Vice Chiefs of Staff of the United States Air Force
Recipients of the Defense Distinguished Service Medal
Recipients of the Air Force Distinguished Service Medal